Rectilinear Research Corporation was a manufacturer of loudspeakers.  The company was formed around 1966 and its principal was Morris I. Wiener (alt. sp. "Weiner") of Plandome Manor, New York.

The first known main office location for the company (1966–68) was at 30 Main Street, Brooklyn, New York.  Some time around 1968, the company moved headquarters, manufacturing assembly, and service center to 107 Bruckner Blvd (E 133rd St.) in the Bronx. The company remained at this address until it was shuttered in 1977–8.

Arnold Schwartz (Micro-Acoustics, founded in 1966), James Bongiorno (Ampzilla, founded in 1974), Marty Gersten (Ohm Acoustics, founded 1971), Jon Dahlquist (co-founder [with Saul B. Marantz] of Dahlquist Phased Array in 1978 ), and Richard Shahinian (later engineer designer with Harman Kardon and founder of Shahinian Acoustics  at or around 1975) were at different times and at different stages working with the company as engineers to develop speaker models.

The company launched its first model, the Rectilinear III, in 1966. The early versions were designed by Arnold Schwartz and later by James Bongiorno (who also designed the Rectilinear X model).

The first known independent notice for the "III" is a retailer advertisement dated 12/4/1966. This model, as did many later Rectilinear models, received many positive reviews by audio journalists in major audio magazines, including Stereo Review, Popular Electronics, Buyer's Guide Magazine, and Stereo & Hi-Fi Times. Three of the company's print advertisements were illustrated by the artist Rick Meyerowitz and ran in publications such as Rolling Stone, National Lampoon, and others in 1973 and 1974.

Although formally this model always carried the name "III", it was colloquially often nicknamed the "Highboy" following the launch of the "III Lowboy" (around 1970) in order not to confuse the two models. Both the III "Highboy" and III Lowboy are pictured here.

By 1971, Rectilinear had expanded its product range to include the following speaker models (MSRP prices per speaker):

 III (3-way, six drivers) - 35x18x12" - $279
 III Lowboy (3-way, six drivers) - 28x22x12" - $299
 Mini III (3-way) - 19x12x10" - $100
 VI (3-way, six drivers) - 25x14x11" - $239 (discontinued by 1971)
 Xa (3-way) - 25x14x11" - $199
 XI (2-way) - 23x12x11" - $80
 XII (3-way) - 25x14x11" - $139

Some of these early 3-way models featured 10" and 12" woofers manufactured by Jensen ("Flex-Air") and CTS (Chicago Telephone Supply), 5" whizzer cone squawkers manufactured by Philips Electronics of the Netherlands, and 2" and 2.5" cone tweeters by Peerless of Denmark. The Rectilinear speakers were typically, but not always, of ported design and finished in walnut with fabric or fretwork grilles. Many models featured one, or sometimes two, rear tone controls.  The company offered some of their models as kits and "semi-kits".

Later models (1971 - approx. 1977) include:

 2
 4
 4.5
 5
 7 (high output fuse version "MTH 4" also available)
 7A
 IIIa
 IIIb
 X
 XIa
 XIb

The company also produced a tilted speaker stand, the "Rectilinear Dispersion Base", intended to be used with the Model 5 speaker.

Although the Rectilinear speakers were distributed through a nationwide network of up to 400 dealers, most of their sales was generated on the East Coast. Distributor in Canada was H Roy Gray Ltd., 14 Laidlaw Blvd., Markham, Ontario. International and military sales were offered by Royal Sound Co., 409 North Main St., Freeport, New York.

References

External links
 Database for Rectilinear literature
 Photo database for Rectilinear loudspeakers
 Known models and data (work in progress)
 Driver Interchangeability

Audio equipment manufacturers of the United States
Loudspeaker manufacturers
Manufacturing companies based in New York (state)
Electronics companies established in 1966
Technology companies disestablished in 1978
Manufacturing companies disestablished in 1978
1966 establishments in New York City
1982 disestablishments in New York (state)
Defunct companies based in New York (state)
American companies disestablished in 1978